"Lottery" is a song by American singer Kali Uchis. It was released as a single from her debut EP, Por Vida.

Reception
Vogue'''s Alex Frank wrote that "while the production twinkles like a classic Supremes song, Uchis quivers between pretty singing and straightforward rapping for some very frank lyrics about life and love in the modern world". Writing for The Fader'', Zara Golden opined "it's another bit of fizzy, pink-tinged and attitude chocked modern Motown".

References

2015 singles
2015 songs
Kali Uchis songs